Frederick George Hamley (October 24, 1903 – May 5, 1975) was a United States circuit judge of the United States Court of Appeals for the Ninth Circuit.

Education and career

Born in Seattle, Washington, Hamley received a Bachelor of Arts degree from the University of Washington, and a Bachelor of Laws from the University of Washington School of Law in 1932. He was in private practice in Seattle from 1932 to 1938, when he became Superintendent of the Seattle Water Department, and then an assistant district counsel for the United States Bureau of Reclamation for the Grand Coulee Dam from 1938 to 1940. He was a special assistant state attorney general and legal advisor to the Governor of Washington from 1940 to 1941. He was Director of the Department of Public Service for the State of Washington from 1941 to 1943. He was an assistant general solicitor for the National Association of Railroad and Utilities Commissioners from 1943 to 1945, and was then the general solicitor o that organization from 1945 to 1949. He was a justice of the Washington Supreme Court from 1949 to 1956, serving as chief justice from 1955 to 1956.

Federal judicial service

On May 22, 1956, Hamley was nominated by President Dwight D. Eisenhower to a seat on the United States Court of Appeals for the Ninth Circuit vacated by Judge Homer Bone. Hamley was confirmed by the United States Senate on June 29, 1956, and received his commission on July 2, 1956. He assumed senior status on July 6, 1971, serving in that capacity until his death on May 5, 1975.

References

Sources
 
 Frederick G. Hamley Papers. 1933-1963. 6.83 cubic feet. At the Labor Archives of Washington, University of Washington

1903 births
1975 deaths
Judges of the United States Court of Appeals for the Ninth Circuit
United States court of appeals judges appointed by Dwight D. Eisenhower
20th-century American judges
University of Washington School of Law alumni
University of Washington alumni
Justices of the Washington Supreme Court